The 1978 Norwegian Football Cup was the 73rd edition of the Norwegian annual knockout football tournament. The Cup was won by Lillestrøm after beating Brann in the cup final with the score 2–1. This was Lillestrøm's second Norwegian Cup title.

First round

|-
|colspan="3" style="background-color:#97DEFF"|Replay

|-
|colspan="3" style="background-color:#97DEFF"|2nd replay

|}

Second round

|-
|colspan="3" style="background-color:#97DEFF"|Replay

|}

Third round

|colspan="3" style="background-color:#97DEFF"|25 July 1978

|-
|colspan="3" style="background-color:#97DEFF"|26 July 1978

|-
|colspan="3" style="background-color:#97DEFF"|27 July 1978

|-
|colspan="3" style="background-color:#97DEFF"|29 July 1978

|-
|colspan="3" style="background-color:#97DEFF"|30 July 1978

|-
|colspan="3" style="background-color:#97DEFF"|2 August 1978

|-
|colspan="3" style="background-color:#97DEFF"|3 August 1978

|-
|colspan="3" style="background-color:#97DEFF"|Replay: 2 August 1978

|}

Fourth round

|colspan="3" style="background-color:#97DEFF"|23 August 1978

|-
|colspan="3" style="background-color:#97DEFF"|24 August 1978

|}

Quarter-finals

|colspan="3" style="background-color:#97DEFF"|6 September 1978

|-
|colspan="3" style="background-color:#97DEFF"|Replay: 15 September 1978

|}

Semi-finals

Replay

Final

Lillestrøm's winning squad: Arne Amundsen, Per Berg (Arne Dokken 45), Jan Birkelund, Tore Kordahl, Georg Hammer, Frank Grønlund, Gunnar Lønstad, Øivind
Tomteberget, Leif Hansen, Tom Lund, Vidar Hansen and Rolf Nordberg.

Brann's team: Jan Knudsen, Helge Karlsen, Bjørn Brandt, Terje Rolland, Tore Nordtvedt, Kjell Rune Pedersen (Ingvar Dalhaug 81), Atle Hellesø,
Neil MacLeod, Ingvald Huseklepp, Steinar Aase and Bjørn Tronstad.

References 
http://www.rsssf.no

Norwegian Football Cup seasons
Norway
Football Cup